Football 7-a-side at the 1996 Summer Paralympics consisted of a men's team event.

Medal summary

References 

 

 
Football
1996
Paralympics
1996
1996 in American soccer
1996 in Russian football
1996–97 in Dutch football
1996–97 in Spanish football